Van Soest v Residual Health Management Unit [2001] 1 NZLR 179 is a cited case in New Zealand regarding nervous shock cases
.

Background
This case involves relatives of patients that died during surgery under surgeon Keith Ramstead at Christchurch Hospital.

The relatives sued the Residual Health Management in tort for the nervous shock that they suffered as a result of having a relative die.

Held
The Court of Appeal rejected the relatives claim, as they were only claiming they suffered grief, holding that they law required a higher standard for a nervous shock case to be successful.

References

Court of Appeal of New Zealand cases
New Zealand tort case law
2001 in case law
2001 in New Zealand law